The Flashline Mars Arctic Research Station (FMARS) is the first of two simulated Mars habitats (or Mars Analog Research Stations) located on Devon Island, Nunavut, Canada, which is owned and operated by the Mars Society. The station is a member of the EU-INTERACT, circumarctic network of currently 89 terrestrial field bases located in northern Europe, Russia, US, Canada, Greenland, Iceland, the Faroe Islands, and Scotland as well as stations in northern alpine areas.

Background

The station is situated on Haynes Ridge, overlooking the Haughton impact crater, a  diameter crater formed approximately 39 million years ago (late Eocene).

FMARS is the first research station of its kind to be built, completed in the summer of 2000.

Operated by the non-profit Mars Society, the station's mission is to help develop key knowledge needed to prepare for human Mars exploration, and to inspire the public by making real the vision of human exploration of Mars. The society uses the station to conduct geological and biological exploration under conditions similar to those found on Mars, to develop field tactics based on those explorations, to test habitat design features, tools, and technologies, and to assess crew selection protocols.

The project's final cost was US$1.3 million, raised through sponsorships with major companies. Flashline.com, an internet business, donated $175,000 and was granted the right to affix its name to the project. Other major sponsors included the Kirsch Foundation, the Foundation for the International Non-governmental Development of Space (FINDS) and the Discovery Channel (which purchased exclusive English-language TV rights to the station's activities for the first two years).

The FMARS project is one of four stations originally planned by the Mars Society as part of the Mars Analog Research Station Program. The Mars Desert Research Station (MDRS) began operation in 2002 in southern Utah.  Stations to be built in Europe (European Mars Analog Research Station / EuroMARS) and Australia (Australia Mars Analog Research Station / MARS-Oz) have not progressed beyond the planning stages.

Establishment of the station

The establishment of a human Mars exploration analog research station on Devon Island was first proposed by Pascal Lee in April 1998. The station was officially selected as the Mars Society's first project at the society's Founding Convention in August 1998.

The station was designed by architect Kurt Micheels and design engineer Wayne Cassalls in coordination with Robert Zubrin and numerous Mars Society volunteers.

Kurt Micheels and Robert Zubrin conducted a scouting expedition to Devon Island as part of the 1999 field season of NASA's Haughton Mars Project (HMP), in order to gain the information needed to plan operations and to determine an optimum site for station construction. An appropriate site was selected on a ridge overlooking the Haughton crater, which was named Haynes Ridge by Robert Zubrin in honor of the late Professor Robert Haynes of York University, a founding member of the Mars Society and seminal thinker on issues concerning the terraforming of Mars. Following this scouting expedition, Kurt Micheels was selected as the station's project manager.

The station's structure was fabricated between January 2000 and June 2000 by Infrastructures Composites International (Infracomp) under the direction of John Kunz, using a unique type of fiberglass honeycomb construction technology. The Mars Society provided Infracomp additional manpower from Mesa Fiberglass, Pioneer Astronautics and the Rocky Mountain Mars Society Chapter in order to meet the deadline for station deployment. The station's components were transported by truck to Moffett Field, California and loaded onto three C-130 aircraft operated by the U.S. Marine Corps 4th Air Delivery Battalion. The first C-130 departed Moffett Field headed for the arctic on July 1, 2000.

On July 3, 2000, the three C-130s, Kurt Micheels, John Kunz, and a paid team of construction workers were in Resolute. The construction team traveled to Devon Island via Twin Otters on July 4. On July 5 the Marines conducted five successful paradrops of station components. A sixth paradrop was also successful on July 8.

The seventh and final paradrop, conducted on July 8, was unsuccessful. The parachute separated from the payload at an altitude of 1000 feet. The payload contained a crane for use in constructing the station, a trailer intended to transport the station sections from their landing locations to the construction site, and the fiberglass floors for the structure. All were completely destroyed.

On July 12, Kurt Micheels and the construction crew left Devon Island and returned to Resolute, unable to find a way to continue station construction. Micheels later resigned as project manager on July 15.

The Mars Society engaged the services of Aziz Kheraj, the owner of Resolute's South Camp Inn. He flew to Devon Island on July 12 and assessed the situation. He would go on to provide critical support, equipment and materials that allowed construction of the station to proceed.

Frank Schubert, a Mars Society member who was a homebuilder by trade, had been sent to Resolute following the initial team. It was originally intended that he focus on the interior build-out of the station, but instead played a key role in erecting the structure and was appointed by Robert Zubrin as replacement project manager. He spent several days developing a new construction plan and was joined in Resolute by Zubrin on July 15. John Kunz also agreed to remain and assist the construction effort. Zubrin and Schubert flew to Devon Island later in the day on July 15. John Kunz flew back to Devon Island on July 16.

On July 17 parts were obtained from Resolute that were used to construct a crude replacement trailer. Enlisting the help of volunteers from HMP and members of a Japanese TV crew, six of the wall segments were transported from their landing location within the crater to the construction site.

The remainder of the habitat's components were transported to the construction site on July 18 and July 19. The existing volunteers were assisted by Joe Amarualuk and several Inuit high school students who also volunteered to help.

Matt Smola, the foreman of Frank Schubert's construction company in Denver, arrived on Devon Island on July 20 and assisted with station construction.

The station's wall sections were raised to vertical and connected to each other July 20 through July 22. The floors of the station were constructed out of wood and assembled on July 23 and July 24. The dome roof of the station was assembled July 24, 25 and 26th. This completed the exterior construction of the station.

Individuals from HMP, the Discovery Channel film team and a number of journalists on-site assisted with the interior build-out of the station, which was only partially completed. Finishing touches of the interior build-out would occur the following year.

A red, green and blue Martian tricolor flag was raised on the 28th atop the station.

An inauguration ceremony took place at 9PM on the 28th. Every human being on the island attended. This included approximately fifty scientists, Inuit, and journalists. Several individuals spoke. Robert Zubrin gave the concluding remarks and dedicated the station to those whose cause it will ultimately serve, a people who are yet to be, the pioneers of Mars. The station was christened by smashing a bottle of Canadian sparkling wine against it.

A symbolic first crew occupied the station the night of the 28th and during the day on the 29th. It consisted of Pascal Lee, Marc Boucher, Frank Schubert, Charles Cockell, Bob Nesson and Robert Zubrin.

Frank Schubert, Matt Smola and Robert Zubrin left Devon Island on the afternoon of the 29th.

A shakedown crew then occupied the station for four days. It was commanded by Dr. Carol Stoker, and included Larry Lemke, Bill Clancey, Darlene Lim, Marc Boucher, and Bob Nesson. The crew used a prototype Mars space suit supplied by Hamilton Sundstrand to conduct several EVAs, communications were established with the Mission Support group in Denver, and a list of items for correction, installation or improvement were identified with the habitat and its systems. This crew left Devon Island on August 4.

A much more detailed account of the establishment of the station can be found in the book "Mars on Earth: The Adventures of Space Pioneers in the High Arctic" by Robert Zubrin.

Operations

Flashline Mars Arctic Research Station Management:
 Dr. Robert Zubrin, President, The Mars Society
 James Burk, Executive Director, The Mars Society
 Joe Palaia, Mission Director
 Michael Stoltz, Liaison, Media Relations
 Susan Holden Martin, MBA, J.D., EU-Interact Station Manager

The Mars Society sends researchers to live and work at the station typically for one month during the arctic summer. Each of these expeditions consists of a crew of between 6 and 7 individuals. Typically 1 to 2 months prior to departing for the Canadian Arctic, the crew gathers for an initial face-to-face meeting and training session in Colorado. Departing for the arctic, the crew travels by commercial airline to Resolute. There they spend a few days organizing their supplies and equipment and conducting some final training while waiting for clear weather. They then board Twin Otter aircraft for the final leg of the journey. These aircraft land on a dirt airstrip located on Devon Island near the station. The primary means of crew transportation while on the island is by All-Terrain Vehicles (ATVs).

During the formal Mars simulation period of each expedition, it is required that any outside work be done while wearing a simulated spacesuit and that all communications are conducted by radio. Space suited crew members use a simulated airlock depress/repress procedure upon each exit and entry to the habitat. Communications between the station and off-island researchers are subject to a time delay (typically 20 minutes) which mimics that of actual radio traffic between Earth and Mars. A satellite phone is kept on-site for use in emergencies.

Due to limited visibility of crew members wearing simulated spacesuits, all work outside the station is conducted with one crew member "out-of-sim". It is the responsibility of this crew member to be on the lookout for, and to protect the crew from polar bears. This crew member is typically armed with a pump-action shotgun loaded with slugs. The crew also carries bear deterrent devices known as bear bangers. No polar bears have yet been encountered by the crew of an FMARS expedition, although signs of their presence on the island are regularly seen, and at least one encounter has occurred with participants in the HMP.

Crew members are also required to write periodic reports to document conducted research, to advise on the status of engineering systems, and to capture details related to other aspects of operations. There are four reports that are typically generated, these being the Commander's Report, a Science Report, an Engineering Report and a Narrative Report. The crew transmits these reports to a Mission Support team (typically located in Colorado).

Timeline of operations

In the first field season during the summer of 2001, six separate crews of five to seven people occupied the station and began work.  From 2002 to 2013, seven crews occupied the remote outpost.

2001

An advanced team was sent to Devon Island in April 2001 to check on the condition of the hab after the winter and to finish building out the interior. It consisted of Frank Schubert, Matt Smola, Len Smola, Greg Mungas, Pascal Lee and Joe Amarualik. The team spent one week working within the station and preparing it for the 2001 simulation field season.

FMARS Crew 1, with six personnel, occupied the station from July 7, 2001 through the evening of July 10, 2001.

FMARS Crew 2, with six personnel, occupied the station from the evening of July 10, 2001 through the evening of July 17, 2001.

FMARS Crew 3, with seven personnel, occupied the station from the evening of July 17, 2001 through the morning of July 28, 2001.

FMARS Crew 4, with six personnel, occupied the station for five days.

2002

FMARS Crew 7, with seven personnel, occupied the station from July 9, 2002 through July 26, 2002.

The crew operated under full Mars simulation constraints between July 11 and July 24. In addition to conducting a systematic program of field geology and microbiology under simulated Mars mission conditions, the crew worked successfully with researchers at NASA's Jet Propulsion Lab to take the farthest-north ground-truth measurements ever obtained for the MISR instrument on the Terra Earth-observing satellite.

2003

FMARS Crew 8, with seven personnel, occupied the station from July 7, 2003 through July 30, 2003.

The crew operated under full Mars simulation constraints between July 10 and July 29.

The crew conducted an experiment that tracked their cognitive performance throughout the mission.

2004

FMARS Crew 9 consisted of seven personnel.

2005

FMARS Crew 10, with six personnel, occupied the station beginning on July 12, 2005.

2007

The primary FMARS Crew 11 consisted of seven personnel and one alternate crew member. The station was prepared for the crew arrival by an advance field engineering team consisting of Paul Graham, coordinator of the Mars Society's engineering team, along with the FMARS Crew 11 Chief Engineer James Harris, and several workers from the community of Resolute. Later the advance team was joined by Matt Bamsey, with Paul and the other workers leaving shortly before the main crew's arrival.

The crew operated under full Mars simulation constraints for 100 days, ending on August 21, 2007. This quadrupled the previous record for in-situ Mars mission simulations. They also operated on the Martian 'sol' for over a month, to evaluate the effects on crew psychophysiology or mission operations.

The crew conducted data collection related to a significant number of scientific studies during the course of the mission.

Near the end of the mission, the crew spoke with astronaut Clayton Anderson, who was at that time in orbit aboard the International Space Station.

Logistical support and research authorization for the mission was provided by the Polar Continental Shelf Project.

2009

FMARS Crew 12, with six personnel, occupied the station from July 2, 2009 through July 28, 2009.

The crew operated under full Mars simulation constraints between July 14 and July 26. During the course of the simulation, the crew completed 16 EVAs in 43.5 hrs, traveling a distance of 128 km. This translates into a cumulative in-sim crew time of 106 man-hours and a distance of 323 km. The crew's efforts included a number of firsts for simulated Mars explorers in a Mars analog environment, including the testing of new technologies and equipment for use in robotic aerial surveying, in situ resource utilization (ISRU), geophysical measurement, medical laser treatment, image geotagging, path planning and analysis, and public communications.

The start of the simulation was delayed until July 14 due to a large number of maintenance tasks and facility upgrades which could only be completed out of sim. These included construction of new secondary containment areas for fuel storage, changes to the generator shed to improve safety and functionality, installation of a SmartAsh incinerator and a grey water sump, refit and reconditioning of the simulated space suits, as well as general organization and clean-up within, under, and in the general vicinity of the station. This maintenance ensured full compliance with environmental regulations and improved both operational and aesthetic elements of the station.

2013

FMARS Crew 13 was a station refit crew, and the mission was referred to as Phase 1 of the Mars Society's multi-stage Mars Arctic 365 (MA365) Mission. The refit crew consisted of 9 personnel.

Crew members Joseph Palaia, Adam Nehr, and Justin Sumpter were in residence at the station between July 10 and July 17. Crew members Garrett Edquist and Dr. Alexander Kumar were at the station between July 15 and July 16.

Crew members Jim Moore, Richard Sugden and Richard Spencer also visited Devon Island several times during this timeframe. Crew member Barry Stott remained in Yellowknife during the duration of the expedition to oversee logistics.

Of significant note, the 2013 FMARS expedition was greatly enabled, for the first time, through the use of private aircraft. Two Quest Kodiaks owned by Richard Sugden and Richard Spencer, were used to ferry materials, equipment and crew between Driggs, Idaho and Devon Island. Additionally, a Cessna 421 owned by Barry Stott was used between Driggs, Idaho and Yellowknife, NT.

2017
The arctic portion of the Mars 160 mission concluded on September 3, 2017. Principal Investigators Dr. Shannon Rupert and Dr. Paul Sokoloff acquired permission for research on Inuit-owned land for the first time in FMARS history, allowing for more wide-reaching geology studies than have been done in the past. 

Dr. Alexandre Mangeot was commander of the Mars 160 mission and was joined by Yusuke Murakami (XO – Executive Officer), Dr. Jonathan Clarke (Crew Geologist), Anastasiya Stepanova (Crew Journalist), Anushree Srivastava (Crew Biologist), and Paul Knightly (Crew Geologist). They arrived at the station on July 15, 2017, and departed Devon Island in mid-August.

Research and accomplishments

Each crew establishes research and education / outreach objectives that they strive to accomplish during their time at FMARS.

2001

The crews in 2001 were the first to conduct operations under full Mars simulation constraints, including the use of simulated Mars spacesuits.

EVAs by Crew 1 included the first pedestrian and motorized EVAs while wearing simulated spacesuits. Crew 1 also deployed weather-logging instruments along the western edge of Haynes Ridge.

Crew 2 deployed a geophone flute, provided by the Institut de Physique du Globe de Paris to produce three-dimensional maps of the subsurface. A similar instrument could one day be used on Mars to search for underground water or ice. Rock samples collected on Haynes Ridge during EVA were analyzed in the habitat's lab, and photographs were obtained of cyanobacteria found within them. The crew deployed cosmic ray dosimeters near Trinity Lake and Breccia Hill. The crew also completed questionnaires provided by the University of Quebec at Hull (UQAH) and NASA Johnson Space Center to aid human-factors research.

Crew 3 deployed a dust magnetic properties instrument provided by the Niels Bohr Institute. This instrument is similar to that used on the Mars Pathfinder mission. The crew performed a psychology experiment for the human-factors research group at NASA Johnson Space Center. They conducted a pre-recorded audio question and answer session with visitors at the Kennedy Space Center Visitors Complex, where the society's Mars Desert Research Station was on display. The crew also tested in the field three telerobots, Stumpy, Jan and Titan.

Crew 4 continued to test the three telerobots (Stumpy, Jan and Titan) during multiple EVAs.

Crew 5 tested a two-person ATV designed by Purdue University.

2002

The crew deployed a weather station on Haynes Ridge which had been donated to the Mars Society by Met One Instruments. The weather station provided data on wind direction and speed, barometric pressure, humidity and temperature.

A Terra/MISR reflectance spectrometer provided by the NASA Jet Propulsion Laboratory (JPL) was used to take ground truth reflectance spectra of landforms on Devon Island, to compare with measurements taken by a similar device (MISR) onboard the Earth orbiting Terra satellite. These spectra were collected by the crew during multiple EVAs, and were the farthest-north ground-truth measurements ever taken for the MISR instrument. This was an important demonstration of combined human/robot exploration operations that will need to be done on Mars.

Systematic sampling and characterization of extremophile bacteria from the local environment was conducted, utilizing equipment provided from several sources including Dartmouth College, an epifluorescent microscope sponsored by the Zeiss Company and a molecular laboratory lent by MJ Research.

"In situ" samples were collected by the crew during EVA. These are rock samples that are not broken away from the large rock formations of their origin and are therefore free from modern biological or weathering action. The samples were collected to assist in testing a life-detection experiment called MASSE that was being developed by the Geophysical Department of the Carnegie Institute.

Records were collected of rock-size distribution (in which the fraction of ground covered at each location by sand, granules, pebbles, cobbles, small boulders, and large boulders is estimated) in order to provide a quantitative estimate of the roughness of the ground to compare with coloration on Landsat satellite images.

Additionally, the crew hosted for a short period two journalists from Russian National Television (NTV) who collected footage of the station and its crew during the simulation.

2003

The crew conducted an experiment that tracked their cognitive performance throughout the mission. The results were analyzed and published in a paper by Jan Osburg and Walter Sipes.

2004

Experiments in 2004 primarily focused on an in-depth biodiversity survey of the arctic desert and geological/geophysical study of the Haughton Crater area.  Logistics and engineering experiments were also conducted.

The biodiversity study, led by Dr. Shannon Rupert, involved nine sites along streams ranging from first to third order. This survey was also conducted at each of the Mars Society's Analog Research Stations, including the Mars Desert Research Station (MDRS) in Utah and the planning site at the Australian Arkaroola desert.

Dr. Akos Kereszturi took geological surveys for the early characterization of terrain for the Exomars project. The crew tested an optical lens developed in Hungary called the Micro-Telescopium while on multiple EVAs. The crew found that the lens could be used for 8-15x magnification of objects while the astronaut was in the field, with the lens being fixed on the outside of the helmet.

Other experiments included a Geophysical analysis of Haughton Crater led by Dr. Louise Wynn which answered key questions on the physical characteristics of the 20-million-year-old meteor impactor. Błażej Błażejowski studied microfossils in crater soil deposits.  A logistics study led by Dr. Jason Held found a method of tracking crew consumption by learning the crew's operations tempo.  The crew's engineer, Judd Reed, conducted experiments on image detection in a robotic fish-eye camera, of a design highly relevant to modern Mars rovers.

Crew member Joan Roch was interviewed by a number of French-language media channels, including four times live for television (TVA Network of Quebec), six times for radios (Radio-Canada four times, Radio France Bleu Poitou, CISM 89,3FM Montreal), and three times for newspapers (Journal de Montreal, Metro Montreal, Centre-Presse).

2005

The crew was visited on Devon Island for several days by noted columnist John Tierney, who wrote an op-ed piece about the expedition entitled "Over the Moon" which appeared in the New York Times.

2007

The crew conducted a long-duration mission, lasting four months total. This quadrupled the previous record for in-situ Mars mission simulations. They also operated on the Martian 'sol', (39 minutes longer than the 24-hour Earth day), for over a month, to evaluate the effects on crew psychophysiology or mission operations.

The crew completed the AstroPCI personality inventory, the NEO-Personality Inventory by Costa and McCrae, as well as an online questionnaire battery dealing with stress, coping, and group functioning on five occasions throughout the mission (pre and monthly). The tests were designed to investigate sources of interpersonal stress and strategies to cope. The results were analyzed and published in a paper by Sheryl Bishop and several of the crew members.

The crew conducted data collection related to a significant number of scientific studies during the course of the mission. These included:
 Biological properties of the active layer above the permafrost
 Microbial community comparison within the active layer above the permafrost
 Diversification of microbial activity in different snow types on Devon Island
 Effects of an asynchronous online collaboration tool on knowledge building and science return on a Mars simulation mission
 The role of geologic parameters in predicting bioload above the permafrost, while varying depth, location, and soil type, through the spring thaw transition
 Transient hydrothermal systems of the Haughton impact structure, Devon Island, Canada: Implications for the development of biological habitats
 Tracing the relative contribution of basement and carbonate lithologies in the Haughton crater impactites
 Permafrost landform development over the winter-to-summer transition: Characterization of evolving physical conditions of a polygon field in the Canadian High Arctic
 Observing the "Weeping Cliffs" phenomenon near Haughton Crater as an analogue for Mars
 Regolith landform mapping of Haughton Crater as an analogue for Mars
 Mars Radiation Environment Modeling (MarsREM)
 Measurement and evaluation of support intervention based on distance communication technologies and of physical training on relevance, feasibility and perceived efficacy
 Analysis of group dynamics-perception of situational factors (heterogeneous and international) and its impact on crew interaction and perception of behavior and performance of crew members
 Analysis of station environment habitability, of crew cognitive performance and changes in group dynamics
 CASPER: The use of cardiac autonomic activity as a surrogate marker for sleep in a space analog environment
 Human factors research as part of a space analogue mission on Devon Island
 Seasonal variation of Chironomidae in the ponds of the Canadian High Arctic as a paleoclimatic indicator
 Seasonal variation of the ponds on Devon Island, Nunavut, Canadian High Arctic
 Metrics of a long duration polar expedition: An analogue for human Moon-Mars exploration
 Moon and Mars crew water utilization study conducted at the Flashline Mars Arctic Research Station
 Martian sol influence on sleep stability and mental performance during a long duration analogue exploration mission

The crew also took part in a number of media and outreach events. A documentary team from Les Productions Vic Pelletier, Quebec visited the station for three days. Photographer Christian Lamontagne took pictures for their web-based program. The crew participated in a live interactive Mars Ed event with the NASA Ames Academy, for which their PCSP Principal Investigator Chris McKay gave an on-site introduction at Ames.

Following the mission, several crew members met with Dr. Gary Goodyear, Member of the Canadian Parliament and Chair of the Canadian Space Caucus, to discuss the F-XI LDM mission & the future of space exploration in Canada.

2009

The crew flew the Maveric unmanned aerial vehicle (UAV) six times over Devon Island. Four of these flights were conducted in‐sim for the first time ever, supporting the idea that human Mars explorers could launch, operate and recover a UAV while encumbered by a spacesuit. This capability expanded the crew's field of view and the rate at which they could survey surrounding terrain. The Maveric UAV was deployed at the sites of several hydrothermal pipes, where aerial footage of these features with correlated GPS track information was captured for analysis, aiding later site sampling by crew geologists.

Several GPS units including a Trimble GeoXM, helped the crew navigate on a long‐distance EVA to the Gemini Hills, an extensive deposit of hydrothermal breccia created by the Haughton meteor impact. The primary objective was to locate and sample a gypsum deposit at this site. Gypsum is a hydrated calcium sulfate mineral that is 20% water and is found in abundance on Earth and at many locations on Mars. Used to make plaster of Paris, sheetrock, cement, and other building materials, this white mineral will be an important resource for Mars industry. The crew returned to the Hab with samples from the gypsum deposit, crushed and heated them, and recovered pure liquid water and plaster of Paris. This ISRU demonstration was a first for a Mars simulation.

Seven of the sixteen FMARS EVAs were devoted to two geophysical experiments. One project was to install Devon Island's first seismometer, a Trillium Compact provided by Nanometrics. The crew scouted deployment locations and installed the equipment while fully in‐sim, a first for Mars analog research. Seismic stations similar to this will provide important understanding of the interior of planets including Mars, particularly the deep crust, mantle, and core. The second geophysical project tested how effectively human explorers in space suits could deploy low-frequency electromagnetic survey equipment, a TEM47‐PROTEM provided by Geonics Limited, to search for groundwater beneath Haynes Ridge near the hab location. Future human Mars explorers may conduct similar surveys in their search for life and resources to support human settlement.

The crew conducted and were subjects in a research study using a Class IV High Power Laser therapy device provided by Lighthouse Technical Innovation, Inc. Crew members received treatment on focused areas before and after each EVA. The laser therapy is effective due to the penetration of coherent laser light into the tissues causing deep heating and local vasodilation. The additional blood supply provided by the dilated vessels can serve many functions, most notably preparation of the muscles for physical exertion and accelerated healing of muscle soreness, strain, or pain from past injuries. The laser therapy at the FMARS Hab was effective in relieving symptoms caused by physical exertion and was concurrent with the quick healing of minor injuries, recovery from an illness, and the complete lack of muscle pulls or extended soreness.

The Omega Envoy Project, a team vying for the Google Lunar X PRIZE, provided a prototype lunar rover for testing during the FMARS 2009 mission. The rover was assembled and tested prior to the mission by 4Frontiers Corporation interns, in coordination with the Florida Space Grant Consortium and NASA's Exploration Systems Mission Directorate. Outfitted with a communications and video package designed in collaboration with the University of Central Florida DARPA team, the rover was continuously operated via the internet from the team's headquarters in Orlando, Florida. This demonstration proved key technologies and provided essential teleoperational experience related to communicating with and controlling the rover from a remote location. It provided a deeper understanding of the complexities to be encountered in lunar rover operation.

For all FMARS 2009 EVAs, the crew wore a Garmin Forerunner combined GPS and heart rate monitor system to gather concurrent geographic and physiological data. Crew members also captured geotagged photos and videos using Coolpix P6000 GPS‐enabled cameras, donated by Nikon. These technologies allowed them to easily combine ground and UAV GPS tracks, heart rate data, and photo information within the geographic context of Google Earth to produce visuals for display on the FMARS website.

The crew also gathered data useful for the evolution of MIT's Mission Planner Software, which may be used by future astronauts to generate safe and efficient EVA traverses.

Social media outlets like Twitter, Facebook, YouTube, and Picasa Web Albums also helped the FMARS crew share its activities with the interested public. Some crew members also maintained blogs that garnered substantial followings. At least 25 stories featuring FMARS 2009 have been published, showing media interest in the expedition.

Thanks in large part to The Mars Society volunteers serving on the Mission Support team (in Colorado, Florida, Texas, Washington, and Australia), the FMARS website received a major overhaul this year, helping the crew to organize, manage, and release to the interested public the volumes of generated information. Mission Support posted crew reports, photos and video files to the website, and also assisted in troubleshooting technical problems as they arose. The crew also benefited from the expertise of an international team of physicians who provided telemedicine support.

In coordination with Southern Methodist University (SMU), Florida Space Grant Consortium (FSGC) and the Georgia Space Grant Consortium (GSGC), FMARS crew members conducted four live video webcasts with students groups. These sessions included the SMU Talented & Gifted Program, NASA Kennedy Space Center Interns, NASA Digital Learning Network via Georgia Tech, and Gardendale Magnet Elementary School in Florida. Students, educators, and interns in attendance gave the FMARS crew high praise for providing this glimpse of life in a simulated Mars habitat.

2013

The 2013 expedition was a survey and refit mission, intended to assess the current condition of FMARS and to deliver equipment, materials and supplies necessary to prepare the station for the planned 1-year Mars simulation (Mars Arctic 365).

Accomplishments included:
 Surveyed the station and on-site infrastructure. Found the hab to be sound but identified some minor issues to be addressed next season.
 Delivered one new generator
 Delivered one new ATV. Two additional were purchased and stored in Resolute for deployment next season
 Deployed additional containment areas for fuel storage
 Delivered and installed new cooking equipment
 Delivered a new metal storage and generator building to Resolute for deployment next season
 Assessed ground conditions, staked out the location for the new building, and cleared the site
 Surveyed two new airstrips to provide more options and avoid future landings in crosswinds
 Delivered and installed a new weather station
 Tested new Iridium satellite phones
 Performed some clean up and organization

The Mars Society is planning to conduct a second refit mission in July 2014 to finish station repair and upgrades prior to the start of the planned one-year Mars Arctic 365 mission.

2017

Crew members during the 2017 expedition will carry outreach in field geology, microbiology, lichen ecology, and small crew dynamics. The research will be similar to that conducted during the MDRS portion of the Mars 160 mission, to gauge how different locations affect the data collected. Dr. Shannon Rupert is serving as the principal investigator of the entire Mars 160 mission, including both the MDRS and FMARS portions. Paul Sokoloff, a senior researcher at the Canadian Museum of Nature is also serving as a PI for the FMARS portion.

Publications

The following publications have been based on research performed at FMARS.

2001

 
 Alain Souchier. "Private ground infrastructures for space exploration missions simulations", ActaAstronautica66(2010)1580–1592.
 

Presentations

 Vladimir Pletser, Philippe Lognonne, Michel Diament, Véronique Dehant, Pascal Lee, and Robert Zubrin. "Subsurface Water Detection on Mars by Active Seismology: Simulation at the Mars Society Arctic Research Station", Conference on the Geophysical Detection of Water on Mars, 2001.
 Robert Zubrin. "The Flashline Mars Arctic Research Station: Dispatches from the First Year's Mission Simulation", AIAA 2002-0993 40th AIAA Aerospace Sciences Meeting and Exhibit, Reno, NV. January 14–17, 2002.
 Vladimir Pletser, Robert Zubrin, K. Quinn. "Simulation of Martian EVA at the Mars Society Arctic Research Station", Presented to World Space Congress, Houston, TX. October 2002.

2003

 Jan Osburg and Walter Sipes. "Mars Analog Station Cognitive Testing (MASCOT): Results of First Field Season", SAE-2004-01-2586.
 

Presentations

 Jan Osburg. "Crew Experience at the ‘Flashline Mars Arctic Research Station’ during the 2003 Field Season", Proceedings of the 34th International Conference on Environmental Systems, Colorado Springs, CO, USA, July 2004, SAE-04ICES-31.
 Cockell, C.S., Lim, D.S.S., Braham, S, Lee, P., Clancey, B., "Exobiological protocol and laboratory for the human exploration of Mars: Lessons from a polar impact crater", Journal of the British Interplanetary Society, Vol 56, Num 3–4, pp. 74–86, 2003.
 W.J. Clancey. "Principles for integrating Mars Analog Science, Operations, and Technology Research", Workshop on analog sites and facilities for the human exploration of the moon and Mars, Colorado School of Mines, Golden, CO. May 21–23, 2003

2004

 Held, J., Wynn, L., Reed, J., and R. Wang, "Supply requirement prediction during long-duration space missions using Bayesian estimation", International Journal of Logistics, Vol 10, Num 4, pp. 351–366, 2007.
 Wynn, L., Held, J., Kereszturi, A. and Reed, J., "The Geophysical Study Of An Earth Impact Crater As An Analogue For Studying Martian Impact Craters", published in "On To Mars 2", edited by Zubrin, RM, and Crossman, F. Collector's Guide Publishing Inc. 2006 ed
 S. Sklar and S. Rupert. "A Field Methodology Approach Between an Earth-Based Remote Science Team and a Planetary-Based Field Crew", AAS 06-260, Mars Analog Research, Edited by Jonathan Clarke, Univelt, San Diego, 2006.
.

2007

 M. Bamsey, A. Berinstain, S. Auclair, M. Battler, K. Binsted, K. Bywaters, J. Harris, R. Kobrick, C. McKay. "Four-month Moon and Mars crew water utilization study conducted at the Flashline Mars Arctic Research Station, Devon Island, Nunavut", Advances in Space Research 43 (2009) 1256–1274.
 Binstead, K., Kobrick, R.L., Ogiofa, M., Bishop, S., Lapierre, J. (2010) Human factors research as part of a Mars exploration analogue mission on Devon Island, Planetary and Space Science, v58 (7–8), p 994–1006.
 Bishop, S.L, Kobrick, R., Battler, M., Binsted, K. (2010). FMARS 2007: Stress and coping in an arctic Mars simulation, Acta Astronautica, v 66 (9–10), p 1353–1367. .

Presentations

 Sheryl L. Bishop, Ryan Kobrick, Melissa Battler and Kim Binsted. FMARS 2007: Stress and Coping in an Arctic Mars Simulation, 59th IAC Congress, Glasgow, Scotland, 29 September – 3 October 2008.

2009
Shiro, B., J. Palaia, and K. Ferrone (2009). Use of Web 2.0 Technologies for Public Outreach on a Simulated Mars Mission, Eos Trans. AGU, 90(52), Fall Meet. Suppl., Abstract ED11A-0565, San Francisco, CA, USA.

2010

Shiro, B. and C. Stoker (2010). Iterative Science Strategy on Analog Geophysical EVAs, NASA Lunar Science Forum 2010, 20–22 July, Moffett Field, CA, USA.
Ferrone, K., S. Cusack, C. Garvin, V. W. Kramer, J. Palaia, and B. Shiro (2010). Flashline Mars Arctic Research Station (FMARS) 2009 Crew Perspectives, AIAA paper 2010–2258, In: Proceedings of the AIAA SpaceOps 2010 Conference, 25–30 April, Huntsville, AL, USA.
Shiro, B. (May 13, 2010) In Situ Exploration by Humans in Mars Analog Environments. UND 997 Symposium.
Shiro, B. and K. Ferrone (2010). In Situ Exploration by Humans in Mars Analog Environments, In: Proceedings of the 41st Lunar and Planetary Science Conference, 1–5 March, Abstract 2052, Houston, TX, USA.

Additional publications referencing work done at FMARS

O. Sindiy, K. Ezra, D. DeLaurentis, B. Caldwell, T. McVittie, and K. Simpson (2010) Analogues Supporting Design of Lunar Command, Control, Communication, and Information Architectures. Journal of Aerospace Computing, Information, and Communication.
O. Sindiy, K. Ezra, D. DeLaurentis, B. Caldwell, K. Simpson, and T. McVittie. (2009) Use of Analogous Projects for Trade Space Analysis for Lunar Command, Control, Communication, and Information Architectures. AIAA Infotech@Aerospace Conference, Seattle, WA.

Crews

Crew 1 (2001)

 Pascal Lee – Commander
 Sam Burbank – Film Maker
 Charles Cockell – Biologist
 Rainer Effenhauser – Medical Officer
 Darlene Lim – Geologist
 Frank Schubert – Engineer

Crew 2 (2001)

Robert Zubrin – Commander
Steve Braham – Engineer
Bill Clancey – Cognitive Scientist
Charles Cockell
Vladimir Pletser
Katy Quinn

Crew 3 (2001)

Robert Zubrin – Commander
John Blitch – Robotics Expert
Brent Bos – Planetary Scientist
Steve Braham – Engineer
Cathrine Frandsen – Physicist & Planetary Scientist
Charles Frankel – Geologist
Christine Jayarajah – Chemist

Crew 4 (2001)

 Pascal Lee
 John Blitch – Robotics Expert
 Charles Cockell
 Larry Lemke
 Peter Smith
 Carol Stoker

Crew 5 (2001)

 Pascal Lee
 Charles Cockell
 Kelly Snook
 Jaret Matthews
 Samson Ootoovak

Crew 6 (2001)

 Pascal Lee
 Charles Cockell
 Tamarack Czarnik
 Rocky Persaud
 George James
 Eric Tilenius

Crew 7 (2002)

Robert Zubrin – Commander
Nell Beedle – Executive Officer and Geologist
K. Mark Caviezel – Engineer
Frank Eckardt – Geologist
Shannon Hinsa – Environmental Microbiologist
Markus Landgraf – Physicist
Emily MacDonald – Astrophysicist

Crew 8 (2003)

Dr. Steven McDaniel – Commander and Chief Biologist
Jody Tinsley – Executive Officer and Geologist
Ella Carlsson – Chief Engineer
April Childress – Logistician and Public Affairs Officer
Peter Hong Ung Lee – Medical Officer and Biologist
Jan Osburg – Safety Officer, Communications System Engineer, Navigator and Human Factors Researcher
Digby Tarvin – Engineer and IT Specialist

Crew 9 (2004)

Jason Held – Commander
Blazej Blazejowski – Paleontologist
Akos Kereszturi – Geologist
Judd Reed – Engineer
Joan Roch – Journalist
Shannon Rupert – Biologist
Louise Wynn – Planetary Geology, Health and Safety Officer (HSO), and Journalist

Crew 10 (2005) "Crew Greenleaf"

Judd Reed – Commander and Engineer
Tiffany Vora – Executive Officer, Health and Safety Officer (HSO) and Molecular Biologist
Anthony Kendall – Engineer and Hydrogeologist
Stacy Sklar – Geologist
Tiziana Trabucchi – Paleontologist
Andy Wegner – Analytical Chemist

Crew 11 (2007) "F-XI LDM (FMARS 11 Long Duration Mission)"

Melissa Battler – Commander
Matt Bamsey – Executive Officer and Engineer
Simon Auclair – Geologist
Kim Binstead –  Interdisciplinary Scientist
Kathryn Bywaters – Biologist
James Harris – Chief Engineer
Ryan L. Kobrick – Crew Engineer and Human Factors Researcher
Emily Colvin – Crew Alternate and Engineer
Paul Graham – Advance Team Chief Engineer

Crew 12 (2009)

Vernon Kramer – Commander & Chief Geologist
Joseph E. Palaia, IV – Executive Officer and Engineer
Stacy Cusack – EVA Coordinator & Geologist
Kristine Ferrone – Interdisciplinary Scientist
Christy Garvin – Medical Officer
Brian Shiro – Geophysicist

Crew 13 (2013)

Joseph E. Palaia, IV – Commander
Adam Nehr – Engineer & Pilot
Justin Sumpter – Engineer / IT Support
Barry Stott – Pilot & Expedition Sponsor
Dr. Richard Sugden – Pilot & Expedition Sponsor
Richard Spencer – Pilot & Expedition Sponsor
Garrett Edquist – Videographer
James Moore – Journalist
Dr. Alexander Kumar – Medical Support
Bios for FMARS Crew 13

Crew 14 (2017)

Alexandre Mangeot – Commander
Yusuke Murakami – Executive Officer
Jonathan Clarke – Crew Geologist
Anastasiya Stepanova – Journalist
Anushree Srivastava – Crew Biologist
Paul Knightly  – Crew Geologist

Campus

The campus currently consists of two buildings, the habitat and the generator shack.

Habitat
Its basic size and design is based on the Mars Direct architecture. On the first floor there are two airlocks, a shower and toilet, a room for the space suits, and a combined lab and work area. On the second floor are six crew rooms with bunks, a common area, and a kitchen equipped with a gas stove, refrigerator, microwave, oven and a sink. There is also a loft area accessed by ladder from the second floor which provides storage space and can accommodate a bunk for a seventh crew member.

Generator shack
The generator shack is a small wooden structure located to the east of the habitat. It houses two diesel generators (primary and backup) which alternately provide power for the habitat.

Other
Also on the campus is a greywater sump, a SmartAsh incinerator, secondary containment areas for storage of barrels of gasoline, diesel fuel, and waste oil, and a satellite dish that provides the station's internet connection.

Sponsors

Each FMARS expedition is funded by the Mars Society, and through contributions of equipment, materials and support from various donors and sponsors.

Establishment of the station

The station was made possible due to contributions from a number of organizations, including the Mars Society, Flashline.com, the Kirsch Foundation, the Foundation for the International Non-governmental Development of Space (FINDS), and the Discovery Channel.

2001 expedition

FMARS sponsors in 2001 included the Mars Society, the Institut de Physique du Globe de Paris, the Niels Bohr Institute and Purdue University.

2002 expedition

FMARS sponsors in 2002 included the Mars Society, Met One Instruments, NASA JPL, the Zeiss Company, MJ Research and the Geophysical Department of the Carnegie Institute.

2007 expedition

FMARS sponsors in 2007 included the Mars Society, Polar Continental Shelf Project, Greenleaf Corporation, NASA Spaceward Bound, Mars Society Canada, the Canadian Space Agency, Wataire Industries Inc., Aerogrow, COM DEV, McNally Strumstick, University of Colorado Book Store, The Mac Shack, Solutions, Government of Quebec, and Strider Knives.

2009 expedition

FMARS sponsors in 2009 included the Mars Society, 4Frontiers Corporation, Florida Space Grant Consortium, NASA, Florida's Space Coast, Georgia Space Grant Consortium, Prioria Robotics, AUVSI, Procerus Technologies, Nikon, Lighthouse Technical Innovations, Nanometrics, Geonics Limited, Del Mar College, First Air, E. Barry Stott, MIT Manned Vehicle Laboratory, The Omega Envoy Project, and Tom Jennings Productions.

2013 expedition

FMARS sponsors in 2013 included the Mars Society, Barry Stott, Dr. Richard Sugden, Richard Spencer, Association Planete Mars (the French chapter of the Mars Society), Iridium, Arctic Cat, and TempCoat.

See also

 Colonization of Mars
 Exploration of Mars
 Flag of Mars
 Haughton–Mars Project
 Human mission to Mars
 Life on Mars
 List of research stations in the Arctic
 Mars Desert Research Station
 Mars Direct
 Mars to Stay
 MARS-500
 Outline of space science
 Space colonization
 Timekeeping on Mars

References

External links

Flashline Mars Arctic Research Station (FMARS)
Mars Desert Research Station (MDRS)
The Mars Society
About the Mars Analog Research Program
CBC News article
BBC News article

2001 Expedition
Website of Crew 2 Member Bill Clancey
Web Journal of Crew 2 Member Katy Quinn
Web Journal of Crew 2 Member Vladimir Pletser

2003 Expedition
Website of Crew 8 Member Jan Osburg
MSNBC Reports from Embedded Journalist and Crew 8 Member April Childress
FMARS 2003 Video "A Stepping Stone to Mars"

2005 Expedition
FMARS Flickr Album from Crew 10 Member Anthony Kendall
Anthonares – Blog of Crew 10 Member Anthony Kendall

2007 Expedition
FMARS 2007 Crew – YouTube Channel
Blog of Crew 11 Member James Harris
Mars ho! – Blog of Crew 11 Member Kim Binsted

2009 Expedition
FMARS 2009 Crew – YouTube Channel
FMARS 2009 Crew – Picasa Web Album
Astronaut for Hire – Blog of Crew 12 Member Brian Shiro
The Asian and The Martian – Blog of Crew 12 Member Kristine Ferrone

2013 Expedition
Arctic quest – Article & Video by AOPA

Mars Society
Human analog missions
Colonization of Mars
Exploration of Mars
Research stations in the Arctic
Science and technology in Canada
Buildings and structures in Nunavut
Qikiqtaaluk Region
Devon Island